"Breaking Up" is a song by Australian alternative rock band Eskimo Joe, released in June 2007 as the fourth single from their third studio album, Black Fingernails, Red Wine (2006). "Breaking Up" peaked at number 83 on the Australian Singles Chart.

Music video
The music video for the single was filmed at Bar Beach in Newcastle. The video features Kavyen Temperley and a girl who is played by Teresa Palmer spending the night at the beach. The other two members Joel and Stu do not appear in the video.

Track listing

Charts

Release history

References

2006 songs
2007 singles
Eskimo Joe songs
Mushroom Records singles
Songs written by Joel Quartermain
Songs written by Kavyen Temperley
Songs written by Stuart MacLeod (musician)
Warner Music Australasia singles